John I. Leonard Community High School is a public high school located in Greenacres, Florida, United States.

History

The high school is named after John I. Leonard, who served as the first president of Palm Beach State College (then Palm Beach Junior College) and as Palm Beach County superintendent of public schools from 1936 to 1947. 

On August 7, 1964, Melvin J. Adolphson was named as the first principal of the new high school, which opened in 1965.

In January 1994, the school was annexed into the city of Greenacres.

Notable alumni
 Doug Bochtler (class of 1988), former MLB right-handed pitcher for the San Diego Padres, Detroit Tigers, LA Dodgers, and KC Royals.
Kenrick Ellis (class of 2006), former NFL defensive tackle for the New York Jets, New York Giants, and Minnesota Vikings.
Kevin Fagan (class of 1981), former NFL defensive end for the San Francisco 49ers; two-time Super Bowl champion (XXIII and XXIV).
Pierre Garçon (class of 2004), NFL wide receiver for the Washington Redskins and later for the San Francisco 49ers.
Ryan Hawblitzel (class of 1990), former MLB right-handed pitcher for the Colorado Rockies.
Markus White (class of 2006), former NFL defensive end for the Tampa Bay Buccaneers and the Washington Redskins, as well as the CFL's Saskatchewan Roughriders.

Notes

References
 John I. Leonard High School. "History & Culture".

External links

Educational institutions established in 1965
High schools in Palm Beach County, Florida
Public high schools in Florida
1965 establishments in Florida